Sheykh Ahmad (also Romanized as Sheykh Aḩmad) is a Kurdish village in Hasanlu Rural District, Mohammadyar District, Naqadeh County, West Azerbaijan Province, Iran. At the 2006 census, its population was 468, in 105 families.

References 

Populated places in Naqadeh County